Year 305 (CCCV) was a common year starting on Monday (link will display the full calendar) of the Julian calendar. At the time, it was known as the Year of the Consulship of Constantius and Valerius (or, less frequently, year 1058 Ab urbe condita). The denomination 305 for this year has been used since the early medieval period, when the Anno Domini calendar era became the prevalent method in Europe for naming years.

Events 
 By place 
 Roman Empire 
 May 1 – Emperor Diocletian abdicates and retires to his palace at Salona (modern Split) on the Adriatic coast, after a reign of nearly 21 years, in which the last vestiges of republican government have disappeared. 
 Maximian retires from office, and leaves for Campania or Lucania (southern Italy), to live a life of ease in his luxury villas.
 Constantius I and Galerius are declared Augusti; Flavius Valerius Severus and Maximinus Daza are appointed Caesars.
 Constantius requests leave for his son Constantine I to join him in the west, who has been living at the courts of Diocletian and Galerius as a hostage. Galerius allows Constantine to return.
 Summer – Constantine joins his father at Bononia (Boulogne) in Gaul; they cross the Channel to Britain and make their way to Eboracum (York), capital of Britannia Secunda and home to a large military base. They campaign with success against the Picts.
 Galerius begins a series of campaigns against the Sarmatians, winning his first victory before the end of the year.
 Maximinus Daza persecutes the Christians of Egypt, many of whom take refuge in the desert. In time, this refuge leads to the monastic life. In these monasteries, Coptic writing develops, supporting the propagation of Christian texts.
 Patron of Pozzuoli, Saint Proculus, and patron of Naples, Saint Januarius are thrown to wild beasts in Pozzuoli's Flavian Amphitheater, then beheaded at Solfatara.
 In this or the following year, the Baths of Diocletian are dedicated; the thermae become the largest imperial baths in Rome.

 Asia 
 The Daysan River floods Edessa.

 By topic 
 Commerce 
 Landowners dominate the Roman Empire, and enjoy the title of senator, which exempts them from the crushing taxes imposed on the rest of the population. The Senate has lost all its power and the landowners almost never attend Senate sessions. Members of municipal senates (curiales or decuriones) are charged with the responsibility of collecting taxes and paying arrears; smaller landowners are held responsible for providing recruits for the Roman army, and with keeping wastelands under cultivation.

 Religion 
 Catherine makes a public confession of the Christian gospel at a sacrificial feast ordered by Maximinus Daza at Alexandria. A virgin of royal descent, she is tortured on a spiked wheel (later called the "Catherine Wheel") and beheaded; her remains are spirited to Mount Sinai.
 The Council of Illiberis decrees that priests must be celibate. Additionally, it condemns visiting the homes of Jews and prohibits Christian women from marrying Jews, unless they have converted.

Births 
 Yu Yi (or Zhigong), Chinese calligrapher and general (d. 345)

Deaths 
 Januarius I of Benevento, Roman bishop and martyr
 Catherine of Alexandria, Christian martyr and virgin
 Porphyry of Tyre, Neoplatonist philosopher and writer
 Proculus of Pozzuoli (or Proclus), Christian martyr
 Sossianus Hierocles, Roman proconsul and aristocrat
 Tuoba Yituo, Chinese chieftain of the Tuoba clan
 Vincent, Orontius, and Victor, Christian martyrs
 Wang Rong (or Junchong), Chinese politician (b. 234)
 Zuo Si (or Taichong), Chinese poet and writer (b. 250)

References